The strada statale 235 "di Orzinuovi" (SS 235) was an Italian state road, created in 1959 and disestablished in 2000. It began in Pavia and ended in Brescia, going through the Po Valley in the Lombardy region.

History 
The road was called "di Orzinuovi", from the name of a town located along it.

In 1998 the government decided to devolve to the Regions all the state roads that were not considered of "national importance". The list of those roads, compiled in 2000, defined the state road nr. 235 of "regional interest", and therefore it was devolved to the Lombardy region.

References

External links 

235
Transport in Lombardy
1959 establishments in Italy
2000 disestablishments in Italy